Sumulong is a surname, meaning "to advance" or "to progress", in Filipino. Notable persons with that name include:

Juan Sumulong (1875–1942), Filipino revolutionary, journalist, lawyer, educator, and politician
Lorenzo Sumulong (1905–1997), Filipino politician and senator
Francisco Sumulong (1918–2004), Filipino politician
María Corazón Sumulong Cojuangco Aquino (popularly known as Corazon "Cory" Aquino) (1933–2009), Filipina politician and President of the Philippines (1986–1992)
José Sumulong Cojuangco Jr. (born 1934), former Filipino congressman
Josephine Sumulong Cojuangco-Reyes (1927–2011), Filipina educator
Victor Sumulong (1946–2009), Filipino politician

See also
Sumulong Highway, a highway in the Philippines named after Juan Sumulong
Juan Sumulong Memorial Junior College, Taytay, Rizal, Philippines